The Hamburg Public Library is an historic library building which is located in Hamburg, Berks County, Pennsylvania.

It was added to the National Register of Historic Places in 1988.

History and architectural features
Designed and built between 1903 and 1904, with funds provided in part by the philanthropist Andrew Carnegie, the Hamburg Public Library is one of three thousand similar public libraries that were constructed between 1885 and 1919. 

The building is an "L"-shaped, one-and-one-half-story, brick structure, which was designed in the Romanesque Revival style. The entrance features a small courtyard and square portico, which is topped by an octagonal turret. The interior features an octagonal rotunda.

This library building was added to the National Register of Historic Places in 1988.

Gallery

References

External links
Hamburg Public Library website

Library buildings completed in 1904
Carnegie libraries in Pennsylvania
Libraries on the National Register of Historic Places in Pennsylvania
Romanesque Revival architecture in Pennsylvania
Buildings and structures in Berks County, Pennsylvania
National Register of Historic Places in Berks County, Pennsylvania